Standard Oil Company of Iowa was created in 1885 as a subsidiary of the Standard Oil Trust to handle marketing along the Pacific Coast states of Idaho, Oregon, Washington, California, and Arizona.  Though named for the midwestern state, it never included Iowa as one of its primary marketing areas.  A prior company named Standard Oil of California had been formed in 1877, and was not associated with the Standard Oil Trust. In 1906, Standard Oil of Iowa was dissolved and its assets handed over to a new Standard Oil of California, later Chevron Oil Company, and now the Chevron Corporation. Standard Oil Company of Iowa is thus the original company that is now Chevron.

References

Further reading
Pagetutor.com: Complete text of The History of the Standard Oil Company

Standard Oil
Defunct oil companies of the United States
Petroleum in California
Non-renewable resource companies established in 1885
Non-renewable resource companies disestablished in 1906
1906 disestablishments in California
Chevron Corporation
American companies established in 1885
1885 establishments in California
American companies disestablished in 1906